Tunnagh is a small townland in County Sligo, Ireland. It is near the village of Sooey.

References

Townlands of County Sligo